Oro Diablo is a 2000 Venezuelan film directed by José Ramón Novoa. It was Venezuela's submission to the 73rd Academy Awards for the Academy Award for Best Foreign Language Film, but was not accepted as a nominee.

The film forms part of a trilogy, with the first part being Sicario.

Cast
Rocío Miranda - Isabel
Laureano Olivares - Cae
Armando Gota - Gallego
Pedro Lander - Aroldo
José Gregorio Rivas - José María "Chema"

See also

List of submissions to the 73rd Academy Awards for Best Foreign Language Film

References

External links

2000 films
Venezuelan drama films